Exploring the Reef with Jean-Michel Cousteau (also simply referred to as Exploring the Reef) is a live-action/CGI animated short documentary film included on the fullscreen version of disc 2 of the Finding Nemo 2-Disc Collector's Edition DVD, which was released on November 4, 2003. It features Jean-Michel Cousteau in a documentary film he is trying to make about coral reefs, but Nemo (Alexander Gould), Marlin (Albert Brooks), Dory (Ellen DeGeneres) and the Tank Gang (Willem Dafoe, Brad Garrett, Stephen Root, Vicki Lewis, Austin Pendleton, Allison Janney and Joe Ranft) keep interrupting him.

Plot
Mr. Jean-Michel Cousteau, Jacques Cousteau's son, is narrating about the ocean. As he starts talking about coral reefs, the regal blue tang fish, Dory (Ellen DeGeneres), starts bothering him by entering the frame. The scene then cuts to an anemone that two clownfishes, Nemo (Alexander Gould) and his father, Marlin (Albert Brooks), come out of and Mr. Cousteau sighs for not being able to do his documentary. The scene cuts to real cuttlefishes, which Dory tries to speak to. When Mr. Cousteau tells Dory to stop it, the scene cuts to a live Spanish dancer. This makes Gurgle, Bloat and Jacques think of dancing and soon the tank gang, and all three animated fish are dancing to some music. This infuriates Mr. Cousteau so much that he yells "Stop!" and proceeds to make a quick rant about the water cycle, concluding that "Everyone, everywhere, affects the ocean!". Deb and Bubbles expresse amazement and at first, Mr. Cousteau is satisfied, but when it is revealed that they were listening to the echo inside a conch shell, Mr. Cousteau loses his temper and starts ranting in French causing the two fish to drop her conch, but they catch it. For about 6 seconds, a cartoon still image of Mr. Cousteau shrugging in a swimming suit appears while Musak-style music plays on a title card which reads "Please Stand By".

When Mr. Cousteau comes back, however, he has calmed down and talks with the three fish about coral that have suffered from coral bleaching, while the whitened coral appears on screen. The next topic is coral reproduction. Dory frantically swims to every new egg to say "Happy Birthday", Marlin paternally covers Nemo's eyes and Mr. Cousteau talks about how there are so many eggs, that even the hungriest fish cannot possibly eat all of them. He concludes by talking all about how we must all work hard in order to preserve the beauty of the coral reef. Suddenly, Nemo, Gill, Peach and the other fish interrupt him again, inadvertently summarizing the message of the entire film during their talk. After they're done talking, Mr. Cousteau gets really furious again and the camera cuts to him aboard his boat by night. Humiliated that he has been "Upstaged by fish", Mr. Cousteau mutters that "This would have never happened to Papa." In a before-credits scene, Peach tells the viewers about Mr. Cousteau's website: oceanfutures.org.

Cast
 Jean-Michel Cousteau — Himself
 Voice of Marlin — Albert Brooks
 Voice of Dory — Ellen DeGeneres
 Voice of Nemo — Alexander Gould
 Voice of Gill — Willem Dafoe
 Voice of Peach — Allison Janney
 Voice of Bloat — Brad Garrett
 Voice of Gurgle — Austin Pendleton
 Voice of Deb (& Flo) — Vicki Lewis
 Voice of Jacques — Joe Ranft
 Voice of Bubbles — Stephen Root

References

External links

Finding Nemo DVD page at Disney.com
Jean-Michel Cousteau's Ocean Future Society page on the film
Mooviees page

2003 short documentary films
American films with live action and animation
Disney documentary films
Documentary films about marine biology
Pixar short films
Finding Nemo
Coral reefs
2000s American animated films
American documentary films
2000s English-language films
American animated short films
Animated films about fish